The Muma River (Muma He 牧马河) is a right tributary of the Han River in the Yangtze river basin of northern China. It originates in and flows entirely within Xixiang County of Shaanxi Province.

The main branch of the Muma River is navigable by small boats as far south as the village of Matsung T'an.

Notes

External links
 

Rivers of Shaanxi
Tributaries of the Yangtze River